{{Infobox military unit
|unit_name=Oregon Air National Guard
|image= 142d Fighter Wing - F-15 Eagle.jpg
|image_size= 280px
|caption= An F-15C Eagle of the 123rd Fighter Squadron at Portland ANGB. The 123rd is the oldest unit in the Oregon Air National Guard, having over 76 years of service to the state and nation.
|dates=18 April 1941– present
|country=
|allegiance= 
|branch=   Air National Guard
|type=
|role= "To meet state and federal mission responsibilities."
|size=
|command_structure= Oregon Military DepartmentUnited States National Guard Bureau
|garrison= Oregon Military Department, 1776 Militia Way SE, Salem, Oregon
|garrison_label=
|nickname=
|patron=
|motto="When we are needed, we are there."
|colors=
|colors_label=
|march=
|mascot=
|battles=
|anniversaries=
|decorations=
|battle_honours=

|commander1= President Joe Biden(Commander-in-Chief)Frank Kendall III(Secretary of the Air Force)Governor Tina Kotek''(Governor of Oregon)
|commander1_label= Civilian leadership
|commander2= Major General Michael E. Stencel, USAF
|commander2_label= State Adjutant General
|commander3= Brig. General Donna M. Prigmore, USAF
|commander3_label= Commander, Air Component
|commander4= CCM Mark McDaniel, USAF
|commander4_label= State Command Chief
|notable_commanders=

|identification_symbol=
|identification_symbol_label=Oregon Air National Guard emblem (approved c. January 1989)

|aircraft_attack=
|aircraft_bomber=
|aircraft_Command_and_Control=
|aircraft_electronic=
|aircraft_fighter=F-15C/D Eagle
|aircraft_interceptor=
|aircraft_patrol=
|aircraft_recon=
|aircraft_transport=
|aircraft_tanker=
}}
The Oregon Air National Guard (OR ANG) is the aerial militia of the State of Oregon, United States of America. It is, along with the Oregon Army National Guard, an element of the Oregon National Guard.

As state militia units, the units in the Oregon Air National Guard are not in the normal United States Air Force chain of command. They are under the jurisdiction of the Governor of Oregon though the office of the Oregon Adjutant General unless they are federalized by order of the President of the United States. The Oregon Air National Guard is headquartered at the Oregon Military Department buildings in Salem.

Overview
Under the "Total Force" concept, Oregon Air National Guard units are considered to be Air Reserve Components (ARC) of the United States Air Force (USAF). Oregon ANG units are trained and equipped by the Air Force and are operationally gained by a Major Command of the USAF if federalized. In addition, the Oregon Air National Guard forces are assigned to Air Expeditionary Forces and are subject to deployment tasking orders along with their active duty and Air Force Reserve counterparts in their assigned cycle deployment window.

Along with its federal obligations, the Oregon ANG may be activated by order of the Governor to provide protection of life and property, and preserve peace, order and public safety. State missions include disaster relief in times of earthquakes, hurricanes, floods and forest fires, search and rescue, protection of vital public services, and support to civil defense.

Components
The Oregon Air National Guard consists of the following major units:
 142nd Wing
 Established 18 April 1941 (as: 123rd Observation Squadron); operates: F-15C/D Eagle
 Stationed at: Portland Air National Guard Base, Portland
 Gained by: Air Combat Command
 The Wing consists of over 1,000 officers and airmen, the "Redhawks" guard the Pacific Northwest airspace and coastal waters from northern California to the Canada–US border with F-15 Eagles on 24-hour Air Sovereignty alert. Both operational and training missions take 142d Fighter Wing units around the globe in support of drug interdiction, Air Expeditionary Force missions, and contingency operations.

 173rd Fighter Wing
 Established 1 January 1983 (as: 8123rd Fighter-Interceptor Training Squadron); operates: F-15C/D Eagle
 Stationed at: Kingsley Field Air National Guard Base, Klamath Falls, Oregon
 Gained by: Air Education and Training Command
 Originally an interceptor pilot training squadron, today the wing is an advanced training organization responsible for all USAF F-15 pilot specialization training.

History
The Oregon Air National Guard origins date to 30 July 1940 with the establishment of the 123rd Observation Squadron and is oldest unit of the Oregon Air National Guard. It is one of the 29 original National Guard Observation Squadrons of the United States Army National Guard formed before World War II. The unit consisted of two officers, 108 enlisted men and two aircraft, a North American BC-1A (like the AT-6) and a Douglas O-46A. The squadron flew observation missions primarily along the Pacific Coast and occasionally made mail flights. The 123rd Observation Squadron was ordered into active service on 15 September 1941 as part of the buildup of the Army Air Corps prior to the United States entry into World War II.

On 24 May 1946 the United States Army Air Forces, in response to dramatic postwar military budget cuts, imposed by President Harry S. Truman, allocated inactive unit designations to the National Guard Bureau for the formation of an Air Force National Guard. These unit designations were allotted and transferred to various State National Guard bureaus to provide them unit designations to re-establish them as Air National Guard units.

The modern Oregon ANG received federal recognition on 30 August 1946 as the  142nd Fighter Group at Portland Municipal Airport, Portland. Its 123rd Fighter Squadron''' was equipped with F-51D Mustangs and its mission was the air defense of the state. 18 September 1947, however, is considered the Oregon Air National Guard's official birth concurrent with the establishment of the United States Air Force as a separate branch of the United States military under the National Security Act
 
Today the 142nd Fighter Wing at Portland and the 173rd Fighter Wing at Klamath Falls both fly the F-15 Eagle with a homeland defense mission. After the 11 September 2001 terrorist attacks on the United States, elements of every Air National Guard unit in Oregon has been activated in support of the Global War on Terrorism. Flight crews, aircraft maintenance personnel, communications technicians, air controllers and air security personnel were engaged in Operation Noble Eagle air defense overflights of major United States cities. Also, Oregon ANG units have been deployed overseas as part of Operation Enduring Freedom in Afghanistan and Operation Iraqi Freedom in Iraq as well as other locations as directed.

In April 2016, the Oregon Air National Guard celebrated its 75th Anniversary with a commemorative paint job on one of the 173rd Fighter Wing's F-15's, as seen below.

See also

Oregon Civil Defense Force
Oregon Wing Civil Air Patrol

References

 Gross, Charles J (1996), The Air National Guard and the American Military Tradition, United States Dept. of Defense,

External links

Oregon Military Department
Oregon National Guard web site

United States Air National Guard
Military in Oregon
Military units and formations established in the 1940s
1941 establishments in Oregon